Revolt of the Negro Lawn Jockeys is an album by American jazz saxophonist Jemeel Moondoc, which was recorded live at the 2000 Vision Festival and released on the Eremite label. It was a reunion with vibraphonist Khan Jamal, who recorded with Moondoc before on the album Konstanze's Delight. The quintet also features Nathan Breedlove on trumpet, John Voigt on bass and Codaryl Moffett on drums.

Reception

In his review for AllMusic, Steve Loewy states "Moondoc never loses focus, as the group marches forward with touches of Ayler, Coltrane, and Coleman, while Moondoc's distinct vision is always in the forefront. The audience's approval evidences the power of this group, who creates some of the best jazz of its kind."

The Penguin Guide to Jazz notes that "while the more upbeat music draws succour from some fine improvising, the ballad seems merely drear."

In a double review for JazzTimes, Daniel Piotrowski says "The cathartic beauty of 'You Let Me Into Your Life' features some of Moondoc's most potently languid and gripping playing, while the title track features some great interaction between him, Breedlove and Jamal."

The Wire placed the album in their "50 Records Of The Year 2001" list.

Track listing
All compositions by Jemeel Moondoc
"Moon Mode" - 15:46
"You Let Me Into Your Life" - 13:17
"Revolt of the Negro Lawn Jockeys" - 15:22
"Encore" - 3:00

Personnel
Jemeel Moondoc - alto sax
Nathan Breedlove - trumpet
Khan Jamal - vibraphone
Codaryl Moffett - drums
John Voigt - bass

References

2001 live albums
Jemeel Moondoc live albums
Eremite Records live albums
Albums recorded at the Vision Festival